Kirikeyevo (Qaraqay) is a rural locality (a village) in Belyankovsky Selsoviet, Belokataysky District, Bashkortostan, Russia. The population was 310 as of 2010. There are 3  streets.

Geography 
Kirikeyevo is located 50 km north of Novobelokatay (the district's administrative centre) by road. Kayupovo is the nearest rural locality.

References 

Rural localities in Belokataysky District